Francis Jackson may refer to:

 Francis James Jackson (1770–1814), British diplomat
 Francis Jackson (abolitionist) (1789–1861), abolitionist in Boston, Massachusetts
 Francis Jackson (kidnapping victim) (born 1816 or 1817), a free man sold into slavery leading to the Francis Jackson v. John W. Deshazer court case
 Francis Stanley Jackson (1870–1947), English cricketer, soldier, and Conservative Party politician
 Francis Ernest Jackson (1872–1945), British painter, draughtsman, poster designer, and lithographer
 Francis Jackson (composer) (1917–2022), British organist and composer
 Francis Jackson (footballer) (born 1954), Australian rules footballer
 Francis M. Jackson, attorney

See also
Frank Jackson (disambiguation)